Arachniodes simplicior, the simpler East Indian hollyfern, East Indian holly fern, or variegated shield fern, is a species of fern in the family Dryopteridaceae.

Distribution
China (Anhui, Chongqing, Fujian, SE-Gansu, Guangxi, Guizhou, Henan, Hubei, Hunan, Jiangsu, Jiangxi, S-Shaanxi, Sichuan, Yunnan, Zhejiang); SW-Tibet; Japan; South Korea; Vietnam

References

Dryopteridaceae
Flora of China
Flora of Japan